Abertoir: The International Horror Festival of Wales is an annual horror and horror film festival held in the Aberystwyth Arts Centre in Aberystwyth, Ceredigion, Wales.

History
The festival began as a three-day event in 2006, expanding since to a six-day programme of films and events.

In 2014, Abertoir collaborated with the Wales One World Film Festival (WOW) for the UK premiere of the Argentinian supernatural thriller The Second Death (La Segunda Muerte).

Description
Abertoir the only film festival dedicated to horror films in Wales, and is a member of the European Fantastic Film Festivals Federation.

The festival screens new big-budget horror films, along with classics and independent films. It also includes a short film competition, screening entries from around the world. It often also features music concerts, stage productions and masterclasses.

It maintains a partnership with the WOW Film Festival.

Notable guests
Notable guests of honour have included:

 Lloyd Kaufman (2007)
 Mark Gatiss (2008)
 Doug Bradley (2008 and 2009)
 Herschell Gordon Lewis (2009)
 Robin Hardy (2006 and 2010)
 Victoria Price (daughter of Vincent Price) (2011 and 2015)
 Catriona MacColl (2012)
 Richard Johnson (2013)
 Fabio Frizzi (2013, 2015 & 2016)
 Luigi Cozzi (2014 & 2016)
 Ian McCulloch (2014)
 Dario Russo and David Ashby (creators of Danger 5) (2015)
 Lynn Lowry (2016)
 Sergio Martino (2017)
 Lamberto Bava (2017)
 Brian O'Malley (2017)
 Gary Sherman (film director) (2019)
 John Scott (composer) (2019)
 Norman J. Warren (film director) (2019)

Notable premieres
The following films were premiered at the festival before general release:

 Broken (2006)
 Isolation (2006)
 All The Boys Love Mandy Lane (2007)
 Dead Wood (2007)
 Planet Terror (2007)
 Colin (2008)
 The Uh! Oh! Show (2009)
 Rare Exports (2010)

Notable bands
Notable bands which have played at the film festival include:
 Daemonia (band of horror composer Claudio Simonetti) (2008)
 Zombina and the Skeletones (2009 and 2010)
 The Damned (2010)
 Devilish Presley (2011)
 Fabio Frizzi and the Frizzi 2 Fulci Band (2015, 2016)

See also
 Dead by Dawn
 FrightFest (film festival)

References

External links

Aberystwyth
Film festivals in Wales
Fantasy and horror film festivals in the United Kingdom
Autumn events in Wales